Seongnam Station (석남역) is a subway station on Incheon Subway Line 2 and Seoul Subway Line 7. It first opened as a station on Incheon Subway Line 2 solely in 2016, and Seoul Subway Line 7 opened in May 2021. Despite their identical spelling in the Roman script, the station is not located in the city of Seongnam (성남) southeast of Seoul, as their names in Hangul differ by one letter.

External links

  Station information from Incheon Transit Corporation

Metro stations in Incheon
Seoul Metropolitan Subway stations
Railway stations opened in 2016
Seo District, Incheon
Incheon Subway Line 2
2016 establishments in South Korea